Chico Hamilton Trio Introducing Freddie Gambrell is an album by drummer and bandleader Chico Hamilton, released on the World Pacific label.

Reception

AllMusic rated the album 2 stars.

Track listing
 "Lullaby of the Leaves" (Bernice Petkere, Joe Young) - 5:45
 "Reservation Blues" (Freddie Gambrell) - 4:51
 "These Foolish Things" (Jack Strachey, Holt Marvell, Harry Link) - 4:07
 "Ex-Ray's Friends"  (Gambrell) - 4:06
 "Devil's Demise" - 5:37 (Ben Tucker)
 "You're the Cream in My Coffee" (Ray Henderson, Buddy DeSylva, Lew Brown) - 4:16
 "Midnight Sun" (Lionel Hampton, Sonny Burke, Johnny Mercer) - 4:40
 "Five Minutes More" (Jule Styne, Sammy Cahn) - 3:06

Personnel
Chico Hamilton - drums
Freddie Gambrell - piano
Ben Tucker - bass

References 

World Pacific Records albums
Chico Hamilton albums
1958 albums